Maori Songs is a traditional album released by New Zealand opera diva, Kiri Te Kanawa in 1999 to celebrate the new millennium.

Maori Songs was recorded at Revolver Studios & NO 2 Studio, Abbey Rd.

Track listing
"Hine E Hine"
"Tarakihi (The Locust)"
"Moe Mai E Hine"
"Hoea Ra"
"Matangi"
"Huri Huri"
"E Papa (Titi Torea/E Aue)"
"Ara Ka Titiro"
"Hoki Hoki Tonu Mai"
"Po Ata Rau (Now Is The Hour)"
"Piki Mai"
"Haere Ra E Hine"
"E Pari Ra"
"Akoako O Te Rangi"
"Tahi Nei Taru Kino"
"Po Karekare Ana"

Lyrics
Lyrics and score of Māori music available here: http://folksong.org.nz/waiata.html

Charts

Weekly charts

Year-end charts

References

Kiri Te Kanawa albums
1999 classical albums
Māori music
Māori-language albums